Jon Daniel Franklin (born January 13, 1943) is an American writer. He was born in Enid, Oklahoma. He won the inaugural Pulitzer Prizes in two journalism categories both for his work as a science writer with the Baltimore Evening Sun. Franklin holds a B.S. in journalism from the University of Maryland. He is currently professor emeritus of journalism at his alma mater; previously, Franklin taught creative writing at the University of Oregon and was the head of the technical journalism department at Oregon State University. He received honorary degrees from the University of Maryland in 1981 and Notre Dame de Namur University in 1982.

The Canadian television film Shocktrauma is based on the book Franklin co-wrote with Alan Doelp.

Working for The Baltimore Sun, Franklin won the first Pulitzer Prize for Feature Writing in 1979, for covering a brain surgery, and won the first Pulitzer Prize for Explanatory Journalism in 1985, for a series about molecular psychiatry, "The Mind Fixers".

Books

 Shocktrauma (1980) with Alan Doelp
 Not Quite A Miracle (1983) with Alan Doelp
 Guinea Pig Doctors (1984) with Dr. John T. Sutherland; republished in 2003 as If I Die In The Service Of Science: The Dramatic Stories Of Medical Scientists Who Experimented On Themselves
 Writing for Story: Craft Secrets of a Two-Time Pulitzer Prize Winner (1986)
 
 The Wolf In The Parlor: The Eternal Connection between Humans and Dogs (2009)

References

External links
 

University of Maryland, College Park alumni
Pulitzer Prize for Explanatory Journalism winners
Pulitzer Prize for Feature Writing winners
University of Maryland, College Park faculty
University of Oregon faculty
Living people
Oregon State University faculty
1943 births

20th-century American journalists
American male journalists
Writers from Enid, Oklahoma